The Catholic Church in Slovakia is part of the worldwide Catholic Church, under the spiritual leadership of the Pope in Rome.

Around 55.8%  of the total population is Latin (Roman) Catholic and another 3.8% is Greek Catholic.  The country is divided into 8 Latin dioceses including 3 archdioceses, and there is also a separate Metropolitan jurisdiction for those of the Byzantine Rite, see Slovak Greek Catholic Church.

Taking the percentage of membership in the Catholic Church as an indicator, Slovakia is the third most Catholic Slavic country, after Poland and Croatia.

Structure

Roman Catholic

Archdiocese of Bratislava with the following suffragans:
Archdiocese of Trnava
Diocese of Nitra
Diocese of Žilina
Diocese of Banská Bystrica
Archdiocese of Košice with the following suffragans:
Diocese of Spiš
Diocese of Rožňava
Military Ordinariate of Slovakia

Greek Catholic

Archeparchy of Prešov with the following suffragans: 
Eparchy of Bratislava
Eparchy of Košice

Catholic organizations
eRko: Catholic children and youth organization, member of Fimcap and CIDSE

See also
Slovak Greek Catholic Church
List of Catholic dioceses in Slovakia

References

External links
Oficiálna stránka Katolíckej cirkvi na Slovensku Official webpage 
Homepage of  Catholic Hierarchy about Catholic Church in Slovakia 
Homepage of Giga Catholic about Catholic Church in Slovakia
vatican.va

 
Slovakia
Slovakia